The 2017 Toronto Wolfpack season was the inaugural season for the Toronto Wolfpack rugby league football club. The Wolfpack finished 1st in League 1, winning 20 of their 22 matches, and earned promotion to 2018 Rugby League Championship.

Season review

April 2016

After becoming the first North American team to join the Rugby Football League (RFL) it was announced that former Leigh Centurions coach Paul Rowley would be taking the head coach's role for the Canadian team. Shortly after Brian Noble joined the club as the director of rugby. Coach Rowley announced that his assistant manager would be ex Super League and Ireland international Simon Finnigan. The Wolfpack announced that they would be playing their home games at the 9,600 capacity Lamport Stadium.

July 2016

Toronto announced their first two signings, experienced Wakefield Trinity Wildcats centre Craig Hall and try scoring winger Liam Kay from Leigh Centurions. The Wolfpack later announced that they had signed Warrington Wolves pair, back rower James Laithwaite and halfback Gary Wheeler, in a bid to recruit a competitive squad for the 2017 season.

August 2016

In August, Toronto announced it had signed its first Canadian player, (and Canada's captain) Sheffield Eagles halfback Rhys Jacks. Following this, young Australian halfback Blake Wallace signed for Toronto from the Illawarra Cutters. Further recruitment in the forwards was made as Wales prop Dan Fleming signed with the Wolfpack. 19-year-old halfback Reece Dean also joined the Toronto ranks from Challenge Cup winners Hull FC, identified as a player for the future by coach Rowley. The Wolfpack also announced that Leigh Centurions duo, loose forward Andrew Dixon and winger Jonathan Pownall, were to join for the 2017 season.

September 2016

The first signing of September was loose forward Jack Bussey who was signed from RFL Championship side London Broncos. Toronto bolstered their team further by bringing in experienced Ireland international hooker Bob Beswick from Super League side Leigh Centurions.  Beswick will take up the role of head of strength and conditioning at Toronto along with his playing duties. Greg Worthington was the next to join Paul Rowley's roster with the powerful centre being sign from the coach's former club Leigh.

October 2016

Toronto announced their first American player, United States national representative Ryan Burroughs from the Wentworthville Magpies in the Ron Massey Cup. Bradford Bulls player Kurt Haggerty retired from playing rugby league in order to become part of Paul Rowley's coaching staff at Toronto. In the middle of the month the 2017 fixtures were released and it was revealed that Toronto's first ever League match would be away to London Skolars in March 2017. Their first home game would be in Round 6 against Oxford Rugby League in May 2017. Following the fixture release, Toronto announced that they had signed young prop forward Toby Everett from the London Broncos on a season-long loan.

November 2016

The Wolfpack announced that they had signed former England international and veteran centre Richard Whiting from Super League side Leigh Centurions. In addition to this, young prop forward Steve Crossley signed for the Wolfpack from RFL Championship shield winners Bradford Bulls. Experienced Championship fullback Quentin Laulu-Togaga'e was signed from Sheffield Eagles. Toronto announced the signing of American born prop forward Jerome Veve from the Gold Coast Titans, in addition to this prop Jacob Emmitt signed for the Wolfpack from Swinton Lions. At the 2016 Four Nations final, the Wolfpack held a press conference where it was announced that Tongan prop Fuifui Moimoi had signed a one-year deal with the club from Leigh Centurions. In addition to this it was revealed that Premier Sports had acquired the rights to all of Toronto's matches for the 2017 and 2018 seasons. Furthermore, current Super League champions Wigan Warriors and Challenge Cup winners Hull F.C. will play Toronto in the pre-season friendlies.

December 2016

During this month, the final 18 trialists from Toronto's Last Tackle campaign traveled to the UK to compete in a friendly match against Brighouse Rangers (Toronto's training partners) in order to win a full-time contract with the Wolfpack. With a record crowd of over 500 at Brighouse, the Wolfpack were victorious 28–26 due to a try in the last 5 minutes from Nathan Campbell. After the match it was announced that Jamaican born Campbell would join the first team squad for the 2017 season, in addition to this Canadian born Quinn Ngawati, the 17 year old stand off, was also offered a contract thanks to a try and 4 goals in the match. The final player to receive a full-time contract was USA born Joe Eichner, a second row forward who had previously played for Jacksonville Axemen.

January 2017

Due to the liquidation of the Bradford Bulls, prop Adam Sidlow announced that he had signed with Toronto. Trialist Chad Bain (a Canadian born prop) was called up to the first team by Brian Noble following a man of the match performance in the friendly against Brighouse. During the month, Toronto played their first ever pre-season friendly against reigning Challenge Cup champions Hull FC. The Wolfpack took an early lead through halfback Blake Wallace but Hull soon took the lead and won the match 26–20 with further Toronto tries coming from Fuifui Moimoi, Jonathan Pownall and Liam Kay with captain Craig Hall kicking two conversions.

February 2017

It was announced that Toronto would enter the 2017 Challenge Cup in the 3rd round along with the other League 1 sides. The Wolfpack were drawn away to National Conference League premier side Siddal. They overcame the amateur team 14–6 in tough conditions with American Ryan Burroughs crossing for the first competitive try for the Wolfpack.

March 2017

Toronto started the League 1 season with a comprehensive 76–0 victory over London Skolars. Prop Fuifui Moimoi was the highlight of the match as he crossed for a hat-trick, the first player to achieve that at Toronto. In the process they helped to achieve the record attendance for the Skolars with 1,542 people coming to see the Wolfpack's first ever league game. Following this the Wolfpack travelled to Cumbria to face Whitehaven. Toronto came away with a 24–10 victory on a muddy and wet surface, captain Craig Hall scored the opening try with Liam Kay, Bob Beswick and Jonny Pownall also crossing for tries. Toronto continued their good start to their first Challenge Cup campaign as they beat RFL Championship side London Broncos in a close fought 30–26 win. The Wolfpack rounded up the month with a 48–21 win at the Keighley Cougars, the match was very close with Keighley 9–8 up at half time however the superior fitness of Toronto and a Jonny Pownall hat-trick saw them win the game.

April 2017

Toronto announced the signing of former Leeds Rhinos and retired prop forward Ryan Bailey on a season long contract, meanwhile hooker Sean Penkywicz came back from a ban and signed for the club. The Wolfpack continued their winning run in the league with a comprehensive 82–6 victory over Doncaster, loose forward Jack Bussey scored a hat-trick while Fuifui Moimoi marked his return with a brace of tries along with winger Liam Kay and halfback Blake Wallace also scoring two tries each. Captain Craig Hall kicked a record 13 goals in the match. The following week saw Toronto beat North Wales Crusaders 80–0 in a one sided game, the Wolfpack were 60–0 at halftime with Hall scoring a hat-trick of tries and becoming the first player for the Wolfpack to reach 100 points for the club. The club announced the signing of halfback Ryan Brierley from the Huddersfield Giants, Brierley previously played under coach Paul Rowley at Leigh Centurions. April ended with Toronto's first ever loss in a competitive match as they were narrowly defeated 22–29 by Super League side Salford Red Devils in the Challenge Cup.

May 2017
Team flew back to Toronto for the first ever home game for Toronto at Lamport Stadium on May 6 against Oxford RL. After the game, they immediately flew back to England to prepare for the game on May 12 against Newcastle Thunder. Just after that game, the Wolfpack flew transatlantic again back to Toronto for 2 home games.

Competitions

Pre-season friendlies

League 1

Table

Results

Super 8's

Challenge Cup

Players
Statistics include Challenge Cup, League 1, and Super 8's matches.

Transfers

In

Out

Milestones

CCR3: Quentin Togaga'e, Jonathan Pownall, Greg Worthington, James Laithwaite, Ryan Burroughs, Blake Wallace, Rhys Jacks, Jacob Emmitt, Bob Beswick, Steve Crossley, Andrew Dixon, Richard Whiting, Jack Bussey, Craig Hall, Fuifui Moimoi, Adam Sidlow and Shaun Pick all made their debuts for the Wolfpack.
CCR3: Ryan Burroughs, Greg Worthington and Adam Sidlow all scored their 1st tries for the Wolfpack.
CCR3: Craig Hall kicked his 1st goal for the Wolfpack.
Round 1: Liam Kay and Gary Wheeler made their debuts for the Wolfpack.
Round 1: Craig Hall, Jonathan Pownall, Fuifui Moimoi, Bob Beswick, Liam Kay, Andrew Dixon and Quentin Togaga'e scored their 1st tries for the Wolfpack.
Round 1: Fuifui Moimoi scored his 1st hat-trick for the Wolfpack.
Round 2: Toby Everett made his debut for the Wolfpack.
CCR4: Dan Fleming made his debut for the Wolfpack.
CCR4: Jack Bussey and Rhys Jacks scored their 1st try for the Wolfpack.
Round 3: Blake Wallace scored his 1st try for the Wolfpack.
Round 4: Jack Bussey scored his 1st hat-trick for the Wolfpack.
Round 4: Richard Whiting scored his 1st try for the Wolfpack.
Round 5: Sean Penkywicz and Ryan Bailey made their debuts for the Wolfpack.
Round 5: Sean Penkywicz and Gary Wheeler scored their 1st tries for the Wolfpack.
Round 5: Craig Hall scored his 1st hat-trick for the Wolfpack.
Round 5: Craig Hall reached 100 points for the Wolfpack.
CCR5: Ryan Brierley made his debut for the Wolfpack.
CCR5: Ryan Brierley scored his 1st try for the Wolfpack.
Round 8: Quentin Togaga'e scored his 1st hat-trick for the Wolfpack.
Round 8: Ryan Bailey and Shaun Pick scored their 1st try for the Wolfpack.
Round 9: Tom Dempsey and Joe Eichner made their debut for the Wolfpack.
Round 9: Liam Kay scored his 1st hat-trick for the Wolfpack.
Round 9: Craig Hall reached 200 points for the Wolfpack.
Round 11: Craig Hall kicked his 100th goal for the Wolfpack.
Round 12: Quentin Togaga'e scored his 2nd hat-trick for the Wolfpack.
Round 12: James Laithwaite scored his 1st try for the Wolfpack.
Round 13: Liam Kay scored his 1st five-try haul, his 1st four-try haul and 2nd hat-trick for the Wolfpack.
Round 14: Quinn Ngawati made his debut for the Wolfpack.
Round 14: Steve Crossley scored his 1st try for the Wolfpack.
Round 14: Craig Hall reached 300 points for the Wolfpack.
Round 15: Craig Hall scored his 1st four-try haul and 2nd hat-trick for the Wolfpack.
Round 15: Blake Wallace scored his 1st hat-trick for the Wolfpack.
Round 15: Dan Fleming scored his 1st try for the Wolfpack.
Super 8s Game 2: Blake Wallace scored his 1st four-try haul and 2nd hat-trick for the Wolfpack.
Super 8s Game 2: Jacob Emmitt scored his 1st try for the Wolfpack.
Super 8s Game 4: Liam Kay scored his 3rd hat-trick for the Wolfpack.
Super 8s Game 4: Liam Kay scored his 25th try and reached 100 points for the Wolfpack.
Super 8s Game 4: Craig Hall reached 400 points for the Wolfpack.
Super 8s Game 7: Jonathan Pownall scored his 1st hat-trick for the Wolfpack.
Super 8s Game 7: Jonathan Pownall scored his 25th try and reached 100 points for the Wolfpack.

References

External links
Toronto Wolfpack

2017 in rugby league by club
2017 in Canadian rugby league
Toronto Wolfpack seasons